The Bridge and the Abyss is the ninth studio album by underground American hip hop duo Jedi Mind Tricks. The album contains a feature from Sean Price on the track "Legacy of the Prophet", who died in 2015.

Production
The album reunites Philadelphia rapper Vinnie Paz with producer Stoupe the Enemy of Mankind after Stoupe's departure and eventual reunion from their last album The Thief and the Fallen. Producer C-Lance is credited as co-producer on many on the songs.

Track listing

Samples

"Death Toll Rising" samples "Badminton" by Yanti Bersaudara (1971)
"Marciano's Reign" samples "Rain and Tears" by Aphrodite's Child (1968)
"Certified Dope" featuring Eamon samples "Treat Me Right" by The Panicks (1966)

Charts

References

2018 albums
Jedi Mind Tricks albums